This is Latifa's discography in chronological order, most recent releases to older ones.

Note. Translated English titles and Romanization of Arabic and Transliteration by Latifa's official site.

Releases

Domestic

Albums

Singles

Featured in

Soundtracks

International

Albums 

Album Inchallah released in 1999, the other albums released earlier in the Arab world and they were re-distributed internationally in the year 2000.

Singles

Collections

Featured in

Soundtracks

Unofficial releases

 1990s Al Himma Al Himma Keep up
 1990s Ya Ordon Al Ajwad To Jordan
 1998 Al Hilm Al Arabi Arab's dream Latifa FEAT. others
 2000 French version of the song Wadeh
 2001 Quand On n'a Que l'Amour (Jacques Brel's song)
 2000s (decade) Eradart Al Hayah Will to life
 2002 Ela Toghat Al Alaam To the tyrants of the world
 2003 Medardarah Messed up
 2003 Ten religious songs
 2006 Ashoofik When I see you
 2006 Al Defa The warmth
 2006 Mashyat Marid Walk like an ogre (Patriotic song dedicated to Lebanon, Iraq & Palestine)
Note. 2006 Track Tehwani (Arabic: تهواني) You like me, released officially in the album Mandaloun Nights against Latifa's wish, that's why she consider it unofficial release.
 2007 Watani My homeland (Patriotic song)

References
 Latifa's official site
 Amazon.fr
 UniversalMusic.fr
 Releasing international version of the album Maaloumet Akida

See also

 Latifa
 Latifa videography
 Ela Toghat Al Alaam
 Arabic pop music
 Arabic music
 Raï

Discographies of Tunisian artists
Pop music discographies
Folk music discographies